Yucca potosina, English common name Potosí palm soapwort or Potosi palm, Rzed. is a plant species in the family Asparagaceae, native to the east central Mexico from Hidalgo to San Luís Potosí. It is sometimes cultivated as an ornamental, but not widely.

Yucca potosina is a rather large tree-like species up to 8 m tall, with occasional branching. Leaves are stiff, narrow, rough, up to 100 cm long. Inflorescence is up to 120 cm long. Flowers are white, elongated, up to 50 mm long and 15 mm across.

References

potosina
Plants described in 1955
Flora of Mexico
Flora of Hidalgo (state)
Flora of San Luis Potosí
Flora of Querétaro
Flora of Guanajuato